Rubicon is a historical novel by American author Steven Saylor, first published by St. Martin's Press in 1999. It is the seventh book in his Roma Sub Rosa series of mystery stories set in the final decades of the Roman Republic. The main character is the Roman sleuth Gordianus the Finder.

Plot summary
The year is 49 BC, and Caesar has crossed the Rubicon, throwing the Roman Republic into civil war. At the same time, a favourite cousin of Pompey has been murdered, Pompey and the other leaders of the Optimates faction of the senate are leaving Rome to rally their forces against Caesar, but Pompey forces Gordianus to take on the job of solving the murder. To ensure himself of the Finder's diligence, he seizes his son-in-law and makes him join the Pompeian army, while Gordianus' adoptive son Meto, secretary to Caesar, is part of the other army marching on Rome.

Roma Sub Rosa
1999 American novels
49 BC
St. Martin's Press books